Lynn McAlevey (born 31 May 1953) is a New Zealand former cricketer. He played two first-class matches for Otago in 1975/76. He lectured finance at the University of Otago.

See also
 List of Otago representative cricketers

References

External links
 

1953 births
Living people
New Zealand cricketers
Otago cricketers
Cricketers from Dunedin